Neahkahnie Beach (or Neahkahnie) is a census-designated place and unincorporated community in Tillamook County, Oregon, United States. It is located west of U.S. Route 101, comprising approximately 370 residences north of the city of Manzanita, at the foot of Neahkahnie Mountain. For statistical purposes, the United States Census Bureau has defined Neahkahnie as a census-designated place (CDP). The census definition of the area may not precisely correspond to local understanding of the area with the same name. According to the 2020 Census. the population was 197.

References

Unincorporated communities in Tillamook County, Oregon
Census-designated places in Oregon
Census-designated places in Tillamook County, Oregon
Unincorporated communities in Oregon